Han Chiang University College of Communication, abbreviated as Han Chiang UC, is a non-profit private university college in George Town, Penang, Malaysia.

Han Chiang UC offers a variety of foundation, diploma and undergraduate programmes, and courses in a range of topics, including Communication and Media, Business and Management, and Applied Creative Arts and Design. The university college is also the first educational institution in Northern Malaysia to offer Diploma and Bachelor Degree in Chinese Studies.

Intensive English Course
Han Chiang University College of Communication also provides MUET / IELTS Preparatory Courses for both Malaysian and non-Malaysian students.

Rankings and awards
Formerly Han Chiang College, it was awarded 5-star (Excellent) rating for the overall college-based category in MyQUEST 2012/13 and 2014/15. MyQUEST is the ranking system for private colleges that is provided by the Malaysian Ministry of Education. On 30 April 2013, Han Chiang University College of Communication received the in-principle approval from the Former Prime Minister of Malaysia, Datuk Seri Najib Razak, to be upgraded to a University College. On 2 December 2014, Han Chiang University College of Communication received the formal approval from the Malaysian Ministry of Education for its upgrading to a University College status. The registration of Han Chiang University College of Communication was completed on 3 November 2017, when the Ministry of Higher Education Malaysia handed over the letter of upgrade status to the Chairman of Han Chiang Board of Directors. The university college had increased its number of academic staff with PhD background, upgraded facilities and improving paid up capital to fulfill the requirements of the University College upgrade.

See also
 Han Chiang School
 SJK(C) Han Chiang
 Han Chiang High School

References

External links
 
 Official Han Chiang News website

Private universities and colleges in Malaysia
Vocational colleges in Malaysia
Educational institutions established in 1999
Business schools in Malaysia
Journalism schools in Malaysia
1999 establishments in Malaysia
Universities and colleges in Penang
Malaysian educational websites